The men's ne-waza 62 kilograms Ju-jitsu competition at the 2018 Asian Games in Jakarta was held on 25 August 2018 at the Jakarta Convention Center Assembly Hall. Ju-jitsu made its debut at the 2018 Asian Games. Earlier, it was incorporated into the 2017 Asian Indoor and Martial Arts Games.

Schedule
All times are Western Indonesia Time (UTC+07:00)

Results
Legend
DQ — Won by disqualification

Main bracket

Final

Top half

Bottom half

Repechage

References

Results

External links
Official website

men's 62 kg